Seaborn Reese (November 28, 1846 – March 1, 1907) was an American politician, jurist and lawyer.

Life 
Reese was born in Madison, Georgia in 1846. He attended the University of Georgia (UGA) in Athens but left before graduating in his senior year of 1868. He studied law, gained admittance to the state bar in 1871 and began a law practice in Madison.

After moving to Augusta and then Sparta, Georgia, Reese was elected to the Georgia House of Representatives in the State General Assembly and served in that role from 1872 through 1874. From 1877 to 1880, Reese was the solicitor general of Georgia's northern judicial circuit. In 1882, he successfully ran as a 
Democrat to fill Alexander Stephens' vacated seat for Georgia in the United States House of Representatives during the 47th United States Congress. He was reelected to the 48th and 49th Congresses and served from December 4, 1882, until March 3, 1887.

After his congressional service, Reese served from 1893 to 1900 as judge of the northern judicial circuit. He died in Sparta on March 1, 1907, and was buried in that city's Methodist Church Cemetery.

References

External links 
 

1846 births
1907 deaths
People from Madison, Georgia
American people of Welsh descent
Democratic Party members of the United States House of Representatives from Georgia (U.S. state)
Democratic Party members of the Georgia House of Representatives
Georgia (U.S. state) state court judges
Georgia (U.S. state) lawyers
University of Georgia alumni
19th-century American politicians
19th-century American judges